Otocinclus tapirape is a species of catfish in the family Loricariidae. It is native to the Araguaia River in Brazil. It is a very small fish, reaching 2.4 cm (0.9 inches) SL.

References 

Hypoptopomatini
Fish described in 2002
Fauna of Brazil